This is a list of all the United States Supreme Court cases from volume 382 of the United States Reports:

External links

1965 in United States case law
1966 in United States case law